Libra has been borne by at least two ships of the Italian Navy and may refer to:

 , a  launched in 1937 and stricken in 1964.
 , a  launched in 1988. 

Italian Navy ship names